Paint Your Wagon may refer to:
 Paint Your Wagon (musical), a 1951–1952 musical
 Paint Your Wagon (film), a 1969 film adaptation of the musical, starring Lee Marvin, Clint Eastwood, and Jean Seberg
 Paint Your Wagon (album), a 1986 album by Red Lorry Yellow Lorry
 "Paint Your Wagon", the twenty-fifth and last episode in the 2005 children's television series, Muffin The Mule